Arthur and the Revenge of Maltazard (French: Arthur et la Vengeance de Maltazard) is a 2009 English-language French animated/live-action fantasy adventure film directed and co-written by Luc Besson. It is based on the third book of the Arthur children's books series by Besson. It is the sequel to Arthur and the Invisibles (2006), and the second installment in the Arthur film series.

Arthur and the Revenge of Maltazard was released theatrically in France on 2 December 2009 by EuropaCorp. The film received mixed reviews from critics in France but was received negatively in the rest of the world. Like its predecessor's, it was a box-office success in France but it under-performed internationally, and was released as a direct-to-video in the United States. As a result, the film generated huge losses for EuropaCorp.

A sequel, titled Arthur 3: The War of the Two Worlds and shot back-to-back, was released in 2010 in France.

Plot 
Three years have passed since Arthur saved his grandparents’ home and saved the Minimoys from the evil Maltazard. Arthur stays with his grandparents for the holidays, during which the Bogo Matassalai (a fictitious African society) assign Arthur a series of tests, including camouflage and environmental nonviolence. Having passed these tests, Arthur prepares to see the Minimoys to celebrate, until his father decides to take him and his mother back to the metropolis. When a spider gives Arthur a grain of rice containing a distress-call, which he believes has come from the Minimoys, he returns to his grandparents' house, where the Bogo Matassalai's attempt to give him Minimoy stature through a telescope fails, and they instead wrap him in vines of increasing tightness until he falls as a drop of sap into the Minimoy Max's bar. En route to investigate the Minimoys' condition, Arthur and Max rescue Betameche, who leads Arthur to the King. He then learns that Selenia is held by Maltazard, who is inspired to invade the human world by increasing his own size. Maltazard tricks the Minimoys into completing his design. The telescope itself is destroyed in the process, leaving Arthur trapped at his Minimoy size, while Maltazard is free to roam the world.

Cast 
 Live-action cast
 Freddie Highmore as Arthur Montgomery. Highmore also voice Arthur in animation.
 Mia Farrow as Daisy Suchot
 Ron Crawford as Archibald Suchot. The character is voiced by actor Michel Duchaussoy in the French version.
 Robert Stanton as Armand Montgomery. Stanton replaced Doug Rand, who played the character in the first film. The character is voiced by actor Jean-Paul Rouve in the French version.
 Penny Balfour as Rose Montgomery. The character is voiced by actress Frédérique Bel in the French version, replacing Valérie Lemercier.
 Jean Betote Njamba as the chief of the Matassalai.

 Voice cast
 Selena Gomez as Princess Selenia. Gomez replaced singer Madonna, who voiced the character in the first film. The character is voiced by singer Mylène Farmer in the French version.
 Doug Rand as Prince Betameche. Rand is reprising his role from the original version of the first film, while also replacing Jimmy Fallon, who voiced the character in the Weinstein Company version of the first film. The character is voiced by radio host Cartman in the French version.
 Lou Reed as Maltazard. Reed replaced singer David Bowie, who voiced the character in the first film. The character is voiced by actor Gérard Darmon in the French version, replacing Alain Bashung.
 Snoop Dogg as Max. The character is voiced by rapper Rohff in the French version.
 will.i.am as Snow. The character is voiced by actor Omar Sy in the French version.
 Fergie as Replay. The character is voiced by actor Fred Testot in the French version.
 David Gasman as Emperor Sifrat XVI. Gasman replaced Robert De Niro, who voiced the character in the first film. He also voice the mechanic and the Bogo Chief. 
 Barbara Weber Scaff as Miss Perlanapple
 Alan Fairbanks as Pump Attendant
 Logan Miller as Jake
 Leslie Clack as Ferryman
 Alan Wenger as Mono Cyclop/DaVinci
 Jerry di Giacomo as Proscuitto/Guard
 Paul Bandey as Miro/Unicorn Chief

Reception 
On Rotten Tomatoes the film has an approval rating of 14% based on reviews from 7 critics, with an average rating of 4/10.

Video game 
To promote the film, a video game by Ubisoft was released for PlayStation 3, Xbox 360, Nintendo Wii and Microsoft Windows. The game composes of mostly minigames and cutscenes which are loosely related to the plot of the film.

Sequel 
In 2010, a sequel titled Arthur 3: The War of the Two Worlds was released.

References

External links 
 
 

2009 films
2009 fantasy films
French fantasy adventure films
French children's adventure films
French adventure films
Films directed by Luc Besson
Films set in the 1960s
Films with live action and animation
Films scored by Éric Serra
High fantasy films
EuropaCorp films
Films produced by Luc Besson
Films about shapeshifting
Films about size change
2000s children's fantasy films
English-language French films
2000s English-language films
2000s French films